Robert Summers (June 22, 1922 – April 17, 2012) was an American economist and professor at the University of Pennsylvania, where he taught from 1960. A widely cited early work by Summers is on the small-sample statistical properties of alternate regression estimators where analytical measures are unavailable.

Summers received his Ph.D. from Stanford University.

Summers was part of a team at Penn that developed estimates of national income and output across countries which adjust GDP and components for purchasing power parity in the cost of goods and services among different countries, later termed the Penn World Table.   This yielded large, systematic differences from the common method of using only international exchange rates to convert national products to a common currency.  For that work, Summers and Alan Heston were recognized as American Economic Association Distinguished Fellows for 1998.

Prior to joining the Penn faculty, Summers was on the faculty at Yale University.

Summers was married to Anita Summers.  They are the parents of Lawrence Summers.  His brother is Paul Samuelson. (Their deceased older brother Harold, a lawyer, changed his name to Summers in his youth, and Robert did the same.)  All three of these people were also noted economists, as is his wife's brother Kenneth Arrow.

See also
 Penn effect

References

External links
 "Robert Summers: American Economics Association Distinguished Fellow Citation, 1998"
 Mark Blaug and  Howard R. Vane (2003).  Who's Who in Economics, pp. 811–812.

1922 births
2012 deaths
20th-century American Jews
21st-century American Jews
American economists
Distinguished Fellows of the American Economic Association
Fellows of the Econometric Society
Stanford University alumni
University of Pennsylvania faculty
Yale University faculty